The Wizard of Oz is an arcade pusher game based on the 1939 film that awards token chips and cards that are redeemable for prizes.  The player shoots coins into the machine which drops chips and cards.  The player collects the cards and chips that can be redeemed later for prizes.  The coins are retained by the machine.  Most arcades that have this game will award a jackpot for collecting the entire series of cards.  It can be played by up the six players.  The game is developed by Elaut Belgium and released in the fall of 2010.  According to the company's press release, the game was very well received by players and amusement centers.

Cabinet

Each side of the machine features one of the following characters:
Dorothy
Scarecrow
Tin Man
The Cowardly Lion
The Wicked Witch of the West
Good Witch of the South
Toto (Rare card)

In addition, the cabinet can be retrofitted with different themes and graphics other than the Wizard of Oz.  In eastern countries, this is featured as the Mistral.  Recently, Elaut released Ticket Circus — a version that keeps both the coins and tokens inside the machine.  The tokens in this version are different shapes and there are no cards.  In the summer of 2016 Dave & Busters rolled out exclusive Star Trek themed pushers that dispense the blue and orange tokens and Star Trek cards.

Card and chips
The game only dispenses cards and chips.  Coins that fall are pumped back into the gun.  The game awards a bonus spin on a small light-up wheel once every 30 shots.  Each spot on the wheel could earn the player between 5 up to 50 extra shots.  The standard chips are:
Green (Emerald City)
Red (Ruby slippers)
Most arcades, such as Dave & Buster's and Main Event use their own chips and determine point value for each chip.  Dave & Buster's awards the same point value for their chips, although they have two colors: Navy blue and Orange.

See also  
 The Wizard of Oz (pinball)

References

External links

Information on the game at Elaut USA
Technical information on The Wizard of Oz Page 2 has many key facts about the game. (Mistral PDF)
Birmingham Vending
YouTube video of game being played

Redemption games
Oz (franchise)
The Wizard of Oz (1939 film)